The 1958 Houston Cougars football team represented the University of Houston in the 1958 NCAA University Division football season.  In Hal Lahar's second year as head coach, the Cougars compiled a 5–4 record, 2–2 against conference opponents, and outscored opponents by a total of 209 to 161.

Schedule

References

Houston
Houston Cougars football seasons
Houston Cougars football